Seán O'Brien (born 12 May 1998) is an Irish rugby union player, currently playing for European Rugby Champions Cup winning side Exeter Chiefs. His playing position is centre.

Connacht
O'Brien was named in the Connacht Academy ahead of the 2020–21 season. It is his third year in the academy. He made his Connacht debut in Round 9 of the 2020–21 Pro14 against .

Exeter Chiefs
O'Brien joined Premiership Rugby side Exeter Chiefs ahead of the 2021–22 season.
O’Brien made his debut for the Chiefs on 14 November 2021.

References

External links
itsrugby.co.uk Profile

1998 births
Living people
Irish rugby union players
Connacht Rugby players
Rugby union centres
Exeter Chiefs players